William Compton Carr (10 July 1918 – December 2000) was a British solicitor and Conservative Party politician.

Educated at the Leys School, Cambridge, he became a solicitor.

Political career
Active in Conservative politics, he became a member of the London County Council in October 1956 when he was selected to fill an aldermanic vacancy, having failed to be elected to the council in the previous year.  His term of office expired in 1958, but he returned to the council in 1961, and remained a member until its abolition in 1965.

In the 1959 landslide election, Carr was elected member of parliament (MP) for the seat of Barons Court in west London overturning a small Labour Party majority of 125 to win the seat by 913 votes. He served until the 1964 general election, when Labour regained the seat.

Imprisonment and bankruptcy
Following his exit from parliament, it emerged that Carr had been amassing a serious debt while an MP. In 1971 he was found guilty of fraud in the Central Criminal Court, and was sentenced to 18 months imprisonment. He admitted to having converted nearly £20,000 of his clients' funds to his own use, some of which he used to buy out his partner's share in his legal practice, and part of which he used to pay off "a man who knew something about me which I did not want disclosed". He was struck off the roll of solicitors in the following year. Following his release from prison he was adjudged bankrupt in March 1974 with debts of £97,515 and assets of only £151.

References

1918 births
2000 deaths
Conservative Party (UK) MPs for English constituencies
UK MPs 1959–1964
Members of London County Council
British politicians convicted of crimes